Gali Guleiyan ( and internationally In the Shadows) is a 2017 Indian Hindi-language psychological drama film produced and directed by Dipesh Jain. The film stars Manoj Bajpayee, Ranvir Shorey, Neeraj Kabi, Shahana Goswami and debutant Om Singh. Its poster was released on 3 October 2017.

Gali Guleiyan premiered at the 22nd Busan International Film Festival and was also screened at the 2017 MAMI Film Festival, Indian Film Festival of Los Angeles, Atlanta Film Festival. 42nd Cleveland International Film Festival, Chicago International Film Festival and the 2018 Indian Film Festival of Melbourne. The film was released theatrically in Indian theatres on 7 September 2018. Its lifetime box office collection is estimated at Rs.50 lakhs (About $69,000).

Plot
In the walled city of Old Delhi, a reclusive shopkeeper spends his days obsessively watching people through hidden closed circuit cameras. When he overhears a boy being beaten, he begins to frantically search for the child. As he becomes lost in the labyrinthine alleys of the city and recesses of his mind, his grasp on reality falters, until he eventually stumbles across a shocking truth.

Cast
 Manoj Bajpayee as Khuddoos
 Shahana Goswami as Saira
 Ranvir Shorey as Ganeshi
 Neeraj Kabi as Liakat
 Om Singh as Idris

Critical reception
Deborah Young of The Hollywood Reporter felt the story was "poignantly told with some nice twists", but called its mystery a "fail".

References

External links
 
 

2017 films
Indian psychological drama films
2010s psychological drama films
2017 drama films